Ebersberg is a town in Bavaria, Germany.

Ebersberg may also refer to:
 Ebersberg (district), around the Bavarian town
 Ebersberg (Rhön), a mountain in Hesse, Germany
 Fort Ebersberg, Switzerland, a 1940 fort near the German border
 Ebersberg (Deister), a hill on the Deister ridge overlooking the Deister Gap, Germany

Seem also
 Ebersburg, Hesse, Germany, a municipality